Oskar Marvik (born 22 November 1995) is a Norwegian Greco-Roman wrestler. He won one of the bronze medals in the 130 kg event at the 2021 World Wrestling Championships in Oslo, Norway. He defeated Yasmani Acosta of Chile in his bronze medal match.

In 2022, he lost his bronze medal match in his event at the Matteo Pellicone Ranking Series 2022 held in Rome, Italy. He competed in the 130kg event at the 2022 World Wrestling Championships held in Belgrade, Serbia.

References

External links 
 

Living people
1995 births
Norwegian male sport wrestlers
World Wrestling Championships medalists
21st-century Norwegian people